The  Accident Towing Services Act 2007 (the Act) is a law enacted by the Parliament of the State of Victoria, Australia.  The Act is the prime statute regulating the vehicle towing industry which provides towing and recovery services for light and heavy road vehicles across Victoria.  It is predominately founded on safety and consumer protection sentiments.  The Act continued economic controls over the industry and contains occupational regulation characteristics.   The style of the underlying regulatory scheme varies in parts and represents a blend which is prescriptive in some parts and performance and process-based in others.

The Accident Towing Services Act was the first dedicated statute regulating Victoria's towing industry and replaced provisions in the former Transport Act 1983.  The Act generally strengthened the scheme of regulation for accident towing activity in Victoria and, at the same time, deregulated trade towing industry controls.  In essence, towing vehicles damaged in a road accident and the individuals working in that sector are subject to tight controls while trade towing activities such as breakdown towing have few controls.

The Accident Towing Services Act was passed by the Victorian Parliament on 17 July 2007 and commenced on 1 January 2009.  The Act was developed as part of the Transport Legislation Review conducted by the Department of Transport and is aimed at promoting the safe, efficient and timely provision of towing and related services particularly following road accidents.

The Act forms part of the transport policy and legislation framework in Victoria headed by the Transport Integration Act.  As a result, the application of the Accident Towing Services is subject to the overarching transport system vision, transport system objectives and decision-making principles set out in the Transport Integration Act.

The responsible Victorian Government Minister for the Accident Towing Services Act is the Minister for Roads.

Objectives 
The stated objective of the Accident Towing Services Act is twofold.  First, the Act seeks to promote the safe, efficient and timely provision of accident towing and related services.  Second, the Act seeks to ensure that the persons who provide accident towing services are of appropriate character.

The Act is also aimed at ensuring that the persons in the industry are technically competent to provide accident towing services.  The statute also requires that those persons act with integrity and in a manner that is safe, timely and efficient when providing the services.  Emphasis is also placed on the need for regard to be had to vulnerable persons in recognition of the shock and trauma that typically afflicts persons involved in road accidents.

Outline 
The scheme in the  Accident Towing Services Act broadly sets economic, occupational and general consumer protection controls over the accident towing industry in Victoria.

First, the statute enables maximum numbers of accident towing vehicles to be set across the State through licensing controls and also facilitates the orderly allocation of tow trucks to road accident sites.  Second, the Act sets minimum standards on the character of industry participants and regulates the behaviour of the participants once they enter the industry.

The framework of offences in the Act broadly seeks to give practical effect to the "chain of responsibility" concept in the accident towing sector.  The concept seeks to identify the industry parties who are in a sufficient position of control over risks, in this case potentially unsafe and unethical conduct following road accidents, and to allocate responsibility through law accordingly in order to deter and punish those behaviours in the interest of a safe, clean and efficient industry.

The behavioural controls in the Act cover a wide range of activities and practices including the systematic allocation of tow trucks to accident sites in "controlled areas" and conduct at road accident sites and during post accident repair work.

The scheme was broadly prompted by consumer protection sentiment, in particular, the recognition of the vulnerability of road accident victims.  Care was evident during the development of the scheme to maintain and enhance existing character standards in the accident towing sector due to behavioural issues in Victoria in the past including the infiltration of criminal elements into some areas of the industry and resultant "predatory towing" activities.

Summary 
In broad terms, the Accident Towing Services Act regulates the accident towing industry in Victoria by -

 establishing a licensing scheme for tow trucks which provide accident towing services
 requiring the accreditation of operators of accident towing service businesses and managers of the depots from which accident tow trucks operate
 requiring the accreditation of accident tow truck drivers
 establishing requirements and protections relating to the storage and repair of motor vehicles following road accidents.

Parts 
The  Accident Towing Services Act is divided into eight parts -  
 Preliminary
 Requirements as to tow trucks
 Industry accreditation
 Driver accreditation
 General accident towing and related operations
 Enforcement
 Codes of Practice
 Miscellaneous

Coverage 
The  Accident Towing Services Act regulates the accident towing services sector in Victoria.  The statute defines the sector as the service of operating tow trucks for the purposes of towing vehicles to places following road accidents or towing for the purposes of clearing road accident scenes.

Licensing

Operators 
Part 4 of the  Accident Towing Services Act establishes a licensing scheme for accident tow trucks.  The Act makes it an offence for a person to operate a tow truck for accident towing purposes unless the person who provides the service has a "regular tow truck licence".  In addition, the person must operate the truck from a depot specified in the licence and must hold a towing operator accreditation.  The tow truck must  be registered and be capable of being used for towing services activity.

Drivers 
It is an offence under the Act for a person to drive an unlicensed accident tow truck or a tow truck that is incapable of being used in accident towing work (for example, a tow truck cannot be incapable of towing generally or incapable of towing a vehicle which has a gross vehicle mass of less than 4 tonnes).

Licensing offences - accident scenes 
Prohibitions exist in the  Act against tow trucks attending accident scenes unless the vehicle is licensed.  The offence does not apply if the vehicle attends for the purposes of salvage work only and will not therefore be involved in the act of towing the vehicle from the road accident scene.

Issue of licences

Decision to issue 
The  Act positions VicRoads as the prime agency able to issue both regular and heavy accident towing licences.   However, authorisation to issue licences must be obtained first from the Minister who is conferred with power by the Act to authorise the issuing of regular tow truck licences for particular areas of the State.  The Minister can only make such an authorisation if she or she considers it to be in the public interest having regard to any increase in the need for tow trucks in the relevant area.  Alternatively, the authorisation can be made if the licences are to replace existing licences or exceptional circumstances justify the issue of new licences.  Similar tests apply to the Minister's decision about the numbers of heavy tow truck licences which are to be made available.

Special rules apply to the issue of regular and heavy tow truck licences used for the provision of accident towing services on the CityLink and EastLink toll roads.  Ministerial authorisations for the issue of licences must be published in the Government Gazette and must specify the number of licences to be issued.

Issuing process 
Management of the tow truck licensing process under the Act is the responsibility of VicRoads, Victoria's prime road management and safety agency.  VicRoads is required to issue a public notice advising of the towing licences to be issued, list the procedures to be followed, and state whether the price is to be determined by fixed price or tender and provide other details.   Designated procedures apply during the issuing process.

Tow truck operation offences 
Part 2 of the Act provides a number of criminal offences relating to the operation of accident tow trucks. The offences include -

 failure to take care in driving or operating a tow truck including losing or damaging a motor vehicle or its contents
 leaving a tow truck standing at a road accident site in a manner or for a time which obstructs the road for an unnecessary period
 permitting or allowing a person other than a tow truck driver from travelling in a damaged motor vehicle which is being towed by a tow truck from a road accident scene.

Members of the Victoria Police and VicRoads' authorised officers are given power under the Act to direct a person to leave a restricted road accident site area (an area within a 500-metre radius of an accident damaged vehicle) if the person is causing an unwarranted obstruction to traffic, hindering efforts to attend to any injured persons or damaged property or is otherwise hindering or obstructing the orderly towing of a motor vehicle from a road accident site.  A direction may be given to a tow truck driver, the holder of a tow truck licence or a person engaged in vehicle repair work or persons acting on behalf of those persons.  It is an offence to fail to comply with a direction.

Other relevant provisions 
VicRoads is empowered under the Act to attach conditions to the tow truck licences it issues.  Breach of a condition is an offence.  A tow truck licence is specified to be the property of the holder of the licence.  Despite this, licence holders are prohibited from assigning or renting the licence to another person.  Licences are, however, able to be transferred to other persons whereupon special procedural requirements apply.

The Act provides capacity for VicRoads to cancel or suspend tow truck licences if operators fail to comply with licence conditions or do not comply with a provision of the Act or other relevant Acts such as the Road Safety Act 1986.

Accreditation

Industry management 
Part 3 of the Accident Towing Services Act makes provision for an accreditation scheme for management participants in the accident towing industry.  A person must not conduct an accident towing service business or be the manager of an accident towing depot unless the person holds an accreditation issued by VicRoads.  Part 3 contains provisions relating to the mechanics of these schemes including VicRoads' powers to issue accreditation.  The Part also contains a scheme which seeks to regulate character requirements as part of the accreditation process particularly through the specification of a range of criminal offences which, if they form part of an applicant's background, can result in mandatory or discretionary refusal of accreditation by VicRoads.  The Part also enables VicRoads to attach conditions to an accreditation.   In addition, the Part confers power on the Minister to set service standards to be met by holders of accreditation.  The standards may cover matters such as complaints handling and the provision of information to VicRoads relating to complaints.

The Part also contains power for VicRoads to take disciplinary action against an accredited person if VicRoads is satisfied that the person has contravened the Act, committed a listed offence, contravened a condition of a tow truck licence or an accreditation or if the action is appropriate having regard to the objective of accreditation.  The disciplinary action that may be taken by VicRoads includes suspension or cancellation of accreditation, a direction that the person must undergo training or at the giving of a warning.

The Victorian Civil and Administrative Tribunal is given power by the Act to review decisions made by VicRoads under Part 3 including in relation to refusal of accreditation and cancellation.

Tow truck drivers and trainees

Drivers 
Part 4 of the Accident Towing Services Act contains provision for a tow truck driver accreditation scheme.  The scheme is similar to the scheme set out in Part 3 for management participants in the accident towing industry.  For example, it is an offence for a person to drive an accident tow truck or to accompany the driver of an accident tow truck unless the person holds an accreditation issued by VicRoads.  Power exists in the Part for VicRoads to suspend a tow truck driver accreditation without a show cause process if VicRoads believes on reasonable grounds that the action is in the public interest.

Trainees 
Provision is also made under Part 4 of the Act for VicRoads to issue a tow truck driver trainee permit, a permission which enables a person to accompany a tow truck driver for the purposes of being trained as a driver or to gain knowledge of the towing industry.

Other key provisions 
Part 5 of the Act contains a range of provisions which are integral to the accident towing regulation scheme.

Authority to tow 
A tow truck driver is prohibited from towing a vehicle from a road accident scene unless the driver has obtained an authorisation to tow that vehicle.  Strict conditions apply to the issue and carriage of an authority to tow.  The driver is obliged to tow the vehicle to the place specified in the authority.

Offences at accident scenes 
Conduct at accident scenes is tightly regulated by the Act.  For example, any person at an accident scene or at any time between the time the vehicle is towed from an accident scene and the time when the vehicle is first stored must not tout or solicit for the business of repairing the vehicle or offer or seek to reach an agreement about a quotation or the repair of the vehicle.  Persons are also prohibited from touting or soliciting for the towing or storage of a damaged vehicle at an accident site or attempting to reach an agreement in respect of such matters.

Storage and repair of damaged vehicles 
The storage and repair of vehicles damaged in road accidents is tightly controlled by the Act.

Storage 
The vehicle must be towed to the place specified in the authority to tow and be stored in a secure area.   Tow truck licence holders are required to provide a written notice stating the charges which apply to the storage of the vehicle.  Persons are prohibited by the Act from receiving payment to obtain repair work or as payment for hand over of an accident damaged motor vehicle to another person for that purpose.

Repair 
The Act also contains a number of obligations on vehicle repairers.  A person must not commence or carry our repair work on an accident damaged motor vehicle without approval in writing.   If work commences without authority the person conducting the work is unable to take legal action to commence any sum or charge relating to the work or any quote prepared in relation to the work.

The Act also gives owners of damaged motor vehicles the benefit of a cooling off period in recognition that they may have made an arrangement for repair of the vehicle following an accident without the opportunity to think clearly about the matter due to trauma or shock.   The owner of the vehicle is therefore given three working days after signing an agreement to repair an accident damaged motor vehicle to terminate that agreement and without the owner being liable for costs.

The Act also makes it clear that the owner of an accident damaged motor vehicle is not liable for repairs to the vehicle which are conducted at a place other than that nominated in the authority to tow.  Finally, it is an offence for a person in control of the place where an accident damaged motor vehicle was towed to refuse to release a vehicle or to frustrate or obstruct its release.  It is, however, a defence if the vehicle owner authorised work on the vehicle and towing or storage charges are outstanding.

Special requirements apply to repairers in relation to accident towing services in a controlled area.  A repairier cannot begin a quote for repairs without confirming details with the allocation body.   Other paperwork requirements are also set out in the Act in relation to repairs relating to tows in the controlled area.

Controlled and self-management areas

Controlled areas 
The strictest controls in the Accident Towing Services Act affect the capacity of accident tow  trucks to operate in particular areas apply in relation to "controlled areas", basically most of the areas of the cities of Melbourne and Geelong where behavioural problems in the industry have been greatest in the past.

VicRoads is given power under the Act to declare controlled areas for the purposes of the Act and to appoint a person or body to act as the allocation body for those areas.  A licence holder and driver commits an offence if the persons attend an accident scene in a controlled area or tow or attempt to tow a damaged vehicle unless the allocation body has authorised attendance at the accident scene and the towing activity.  Each accident tow truck licence entitles the holder of the licence to one place on the roster if a specified depot is attached to the licence.  A roster entitlement is not able to be transferred to another operator.

Self-management areas 
The areas of Victoria outside of the controlled areas are called self-management areas.  Licence holders are unable to attend accidents in self-management areas and conduct tows in those areas unless authorised under the Act.  VicRoads is given power under the Act to declare self-management areas for the purposes of the Act.

Enforcement 
Enforcement-related provisions supporting the Accident Towing Services Act scheme are set out in Part 6 of the Act.  The Act can be enforced by officers of the Victoria Police and authorised officers appointed by VicRoads.  The enforcement scheme centres on provisions enabling the appointment of authorised officers, the conferral of certain coercive powers and the availability of a range of administrative and court-based sanctions.

Key elements 
The key elements of the enforcement scheme are - 
 power for VicRoads to appoint authorised officers to enforce the Act
 a demerits points scheme applying to industry participants including accredited persons such as licence holders and drivers
 power for officers to service infringement notices
 powers for officers to serve improvement notices
 coercive powers such as powers to require name and address details, the capacity to enter and search tow trucks, power to require production of identification, entry or search of premises including without warrant, power to obtain search and power to seize of things including documents, equipment and goods
 powers to initiate prosecutions for breaches of the Act

Codes of practice 
Part 7 of the Act makes provision for the Minister to approve codes of practice for the purpose of providing practical guidance under the Act.  Compliance with a codes of practice can act as a safe harbour for persons in the towing industry although failure to comply with a provision in a code does not create any criminal or civil liability.

Miscellaneous 
Part 8 of the Act contains a number of miscellaneous provisions relating to the accident towing services scheme.   Subjects dealt with in the part include -
 power for the Minister to set fees and charges relating to accident towing services and storage of damaged motor vehicles
 power for VicRoads to set application fees
 powers of delegation by VicRoads for the purposes of the Act
 evidentiary, corporate liability and other supporting provisions including offences and powers to make regulations.

Responsible regulator 

The responsible regulator for the application, administration and enforcement of the Accident Towing Services Act in Victoria and therefore for the regulation of the accident towing industry is the Roads Corporation or VicRoads.  VicRoads took over this responsibility from the Victorian Taxi Directorate, a business unit located in the office of the Director of Public Transport attached to the Department of Transport, in late 2006 during the final stages of the development of the Act proposal.  The transfer of responsibility occurred after the creation of a new Ministry of Roads and Ports which separated those portfolios from the former Transport Ministry (a separate Ministry of Public Transport was also created at this time).

Development 

The development of the proposal for the Accident Towing Services was managed by the former Department of Infrastructure in Victoria.  The successor to the Department of Infrastructure in transport matters was the Department of Transport.  The Department managed the project as part of its broader Transport Legislation Review.

The Department held a series of workshops with Victoria's towing industry and issued discussion papers outlining the broad policy features of a proposed new regulatory scheme.  The papers raised a series of concerns about the former towing industry framework and aspects of the industry's performance including concerns about under regulation and over regulation in particular areas.  Comments were requested from industry parties and other interested stakeholders.  Comments received from industry, government and other stakeholders resulted in the refinement of the proposal prior to its approval by the Victorian Government and presentation to Parliament as proposed legislation.

Ultimately, the proposals for a new regulatory scheme were introduced to the Victorian Parliament as proposed legislation in mid April 2007.

Parliamentary approval

Introduction 
The Accident Towing Services Bill was introduced into the lower house of the Victorian Parliament, the Legislative Assembly, as the Accident Towing Services Bill.  The responsible Minister for the proposal was the then Minister for Roads and Ports, the Hon Tim Pallas MP.

Context 
The Minister moved the second reading of the Accident Towing Services on 19 April 2007.  The Minister set the context for the Bill in his speech in support as follows -

"The Government has reviewed the existing towing services framework a number of times in recent years and has concluded that retaining the existing regulatory framework is essential to address the unique problems in the industry and to protect accident victims and benefit road users. The reviews involved extensive consultation with stakeholders.  Also, over the last two years there has been ongoing consultation with industry stakeholders on a proposal for an improved regulatory framework for the industry and a new stand-alone accident towing services statute. ....the Government is committed to retaining the existing regulatory framework, which has been effective for over 20 years.  Therefore, the substantive provisions of the ... Transport Act 1983 relating to accident towing are largely retained by the Bill, but in an improved and modernised form."

Main changes 
The speech also contained an observation on the main change brought about by the new regulatory scheme -

"The Bill introduces one important addition to the existing regulatory framework for accident towing -- industry accreditation. This initiative is aimed at improving existing industry performance. A person who wants to undertake a role within the industry either as an accident towing operator, depot manager or tow-truck driver will be required to obtain accreditation from VicRoads to perform the activities associated with that role. The purpose of the accreditation scheme is to provide assurance about a person's ability and credentials to perform that role. It will be an offence to undertake the activities without the appropriate accreditation. An operator will continue to be required to hold a licence for each tow truck being used to operate an accident towing business."

Strengthening of existing regulation 
The Minister also made observations about the strengthening of existing regulatory requirements provided for in the Bill -

"The existing probity requirements in the Transport Act for accident towing licences and tow-truck driver authorities have been transferred to the new accreditation schemes thus ensuring that there is no reduction of these standards in the industry. Accreditation will help provide assurance that accident towing operators and depot managers are of suitable character and can meet service standards for complaints handling and (that) tow-truck drivers are of suitable character and are competent to tow damaged motor vehicles away from crash scenes."

Responsibilities of industry participants 
Reflections were contained in the speech about the responsibilities owed by industry participants to vulnerable road accident victims -

"The roles performed in the accident towing industry are positions of considerable responsibility and the safety, trust and convenience of those involved in road accidents are imperative. The probity check will, for example, help to protect crash victims who are in a vulnerable state and who may get a lift home in a tow truck from the unacceptable risk of falling prey to a driver who has previously committed a serious criminal offence. It will also help protect accident victims from having their motor vehicle or possessions being mistreated at the depot by operators or depot managers."

Deregulation of the trade towing sector 
The Minister also commented in the following terms about the deregulation of the trade towing sector provided in the Bill -

"Finally, the Bill removes the regulation of trade towing, which encompasses breakdown, clear away zones and non-accident tows. This is consistent with the position in other major States. The Government has found that there is no case for regulation of this sector as the trade towing market is already highly competitive and consumers are able to make an informed choice of trade towing services. This can be clearly contrasted with the accident towing services market. Further, licensing of trade towing is currently 'as of right', attracting nominal fees, thus ensuring that there is no capacity for the licensing authority to refuse a licence. Deregulation will remove unnecessary costs to trade towing businesses and the initiative demonstrates again that the government is fully committed to removing excessive red tape and unnecessary regulation on business. "

Connection to policy objectives 
The Minister commented that -

"Victoria is the national leader in best practice regulation. Examples include our 'Third Wave of National Reform' proposal at the Council of Australian Governments and our ongoing commitment to reducing the regulatory burden on business. The Bill provides further evidence of this, by regulating only to the extent necessary to address market failures in accident towing and to provide wider public benefits such as protecting accident victims and improving road safety and traffic management. It also removes the regulation of trade towing, which is no longer necessary in a competitive market, thus reducing existing industry compliance costs in that sector."

"The Bill is the most significant initiative in accident towing control since the industry was first regulated. It is also a further essential step in the broader reform and modernisation of transport legislation in Victoria and, in particular, the restructuring and improvement of the Transport Act, using the best contemporary process and performance-based regulation and compliance techniques. It again demonstrates ... continuing determination to protect vulnerable accident victims and improve road safety and traffic management for all road users by pursuing best-quality reform to correct market failures."

Conclusion 
The Minister concluded his speech in support of the Accident Towing Services Bill by observing that -

""This Bill establishes Victoria's first stand-alone Accident Towing Services Act and provides a modern and secure platform for better performance in the towing industry. It continues and improves on a proven regulatory framework which has brought criminal and undesirable practices in the industry under control, and which has also protected crash victims and helped enable road accidents scenes to be cleared safely and efficiently in the interests of road safety and congestion management.  The Bill also seeks to improve the performance of the industry by introducing a targeted accreditation scheme to ensure that complaints systems are introduced, thereby encouraging accident towing participants to become more focused on providing better customer service. The Bill also enables VicRoads to determine whether service quality is an issue that should be addressed, and to enforce the regulatory framework more effectively. Accreditation is introduced with minimal compliance costs to the industry and modest increased monitoring costs for Government.

Passage, assent and commencement 

The Bill was considered and passed by the lower house of the Victorian Parliament, the Legislative Assembly, on 19 June 2007.   The Bill was introduced into the upper house, the Legislative Council, on the same day.  Second reading was moved in the upper house the next day, 20 June, and the proposal ultimately debated and passed on 17 July 2007.  2 March 2006.

The Accident Towing Services Bill received royal assent on 24 July 2007 to become the Accident Towing Services Act 2007.  The Act commenced on its default commencement day, 1 January 2010.

The Accident Towing Services Regulations 2007 which were required to support the operation of the Act also operated from the same date thereby formally commencing the scheme.

Changes to the Act 
No significant changes have been made to the Accident Towing Services Act since it commenced.

See also 
 Tow truck
 Towing
 Vehicle recovery
 VicRoads
 Transport Legislation Review
 Transport Integration Act
 Director of Public Transport
 Transport Act 1983
 Transport (Compliance and Miscellaneous) Act 1983

References

External links 
 VicRoads
 Department of Transport

Transport in Victoria (Australia)
Victoria (Australia) legislation
Road transport in Australia
Transport law in Australia
2007 in Australian law
2000s in Victoria (Australia)
Driving
Transport legislation
History of transport in Victoria (Australia)
2007 in transport